Antoñito is a Spanish given name and nickname derived from Antonio. It is loosely equivalent to "Little Tony" in English. People with this nickname include the following notable persons:
 Antonio Ramiro Pérez, known as Antoñito, (born 1978), Spanish footballer
 Antonio Jesús Regal Angulo, known as Antoñito (footballer, born 1987), (born 1987), Spanish footballer
 Antonio Ruiz Escaño, known as Antoñito Ruiz and El Niño Leone (born 1951), child actor and stuntman

See also

Antonijo
Antonino (name)
Antoñita (disambiguation)
Antonio

Spanish-language hypocorisms